The 2001 European Tour was the 30th official season of golf tournaments known as the PGA European Tour.

The season was made up of 46 tournaments counting towards the Order of Merit, which included the four major championships and three World Golf Championships, and several non-counting "Approved Special Events".

The Order of Merit was won by South Africa's Retief Goosen.

Changes for 2001
There were several changes from the previous season, with the Dunhill Links Championship replacing the Dunhill Cup, the Open de Madrid replacing the Turespaña Masters, the Standard Life Loch Lomond being rebranded as the revived Scottish Open, the addition the Caltex Singapore Masters, the Argentine Open and the São Paulo Brazil Open; the return of the Estoril Open; and the loss of both Brazilian 500 year anniversary tournaments and the Belgian Open.

Terrorist attacks in the United States on 11 September led to changes on the tour schedule with the WGC-American Express Championship being cancelled and the Ryder Cup matches at The Belfry being postponed until 2002. The Estoril Open was also cancelled in the wake of the attacks, and was replaced on the schedule with a revival of the Cannes Open.

Schedule
The following table lists official events during the 2001 season.

Unofficial events
The following events were sanctioned by the European Tour, but did not carry official money, nor were wins official.

Order of Merit
The Order of Merit was titled as the Volvo Order of Merit and was based on prize money won during the season, calculated in Euros.

Awards

See also
List of golfers with most European Tour wins

Notes

References

External links
2001 season results on the PGA European Tour website
2001 Order of Merit on the PGA European Tour website

European Tour seasons
European Tour